Taranath Tantrik is a fictional character of Bengali literature created by Bengali legendary novelist Bibhutibhushan Bandyopadhyay and later by his son Taradas Bandyopadhyay.

Character 
Taranath Tantrik is a mystic figure and practitioner of occult. He lives with his daughter Chari in a house of Mott lane in central Kolkata after having lost most of his supernatural powers because of misuse of Tantra. The person looked like a man in his mid fifties. He is an astrologer by profession and had many encounters with the supernatural forces in his extensive travels throughout the Bengal. He shares those experiences with two friends in his Mott lane house over cups of tea and cigarettes. It is stated that the writer is a regular visitor at Taranath’s house, sometimes with his friend, sometimes alone.

Stories 
In 1940, Bibhutibhushan Bandyopadhyay created the character Taranath but he wrote only two short stories featuring this character and much of Taranath’s life is displayed prominently through these stories. Rest of six stories featuring Taranath Tantrik are written by his son Taradas Bandyopadhyay in two acclaimed books named Taranath Tantrik (1985) and Olatchokro (2003). All the stories are supernatural and paranormal, based on dark arts, mystery and magic realism.

Adaptations 
Stories of Taranath was broadcast in Sunday Suspense at Kolkata Radio Mirchi. Bengali filmmaker Q alias Qaushiq Mukherjee has made Hoichoi web series named Taranath Tantrik based on the stories of Taranath Tantrik. Koushik Roy and Jayanta Kripalni played the title role. The character was reimagined as TNT for a series of graphic novels by Shamik Dasgupta. In the year 2016, actor Tota Roy Chowdhury played as Taranath in Taranath Tantrik, a TV Series of Colors Bangla.

References

External links 
  TV series
  Web series
 Taranath Tantrik pdf
 Sunday Suspense Download Tatanath Tantrik Stories

Fictional Bengali people
Culture of Kolkata
Fictional Indian people
Magic realism novels
Tantra